Annie May Jackson (1879-1959) was the first female police officer in Canada, serving from 1912 to 1918. Jackson was made a Constable to the Edmonton Police Department on October 1, 1912, winning out over 47 other applicants. Her photograph as a policewoman appeared on the front page of the London Daily Mirror on August 8, 1913. A neighbourhood of Jackson Heights, in Edmonton, Alberta, Canada, is named in her honour.

Jackson was given the task of helping young girls and women uphold "high morals and manners". She dealt with young women immigrating to Canada who were recruited immediately into prostitution. In 1918 she married William Henry Kelcher and was forced to leave the police force. In 1919 she gave birth to a son, Henry Murray Kelcher.

Jackson died in 1959, after she was hit by a car while walking near her Edmonton home. Since then the Edmonton neighbourhood of Jackson Heights, a nearby road, a park and a school have been named after her to preserve her memory and legacy.

Namesakes

The residential neighbourhood known as Jackson Heights in the Mill Woods area of South East Edmonton, Alberta, Canada was named in honour of Jackson in October 1976. It is located in the Burnewood area of Mill Woods. Jackson Road, named in July 1980, also carries her name. The Annie May Jackson Park was named in her honour in November 1992. On January 29, 2002, Annie May Jackson Park became the site of the Jackson Heights School.

References

Canadian police officers
Pedestrian road incident deaths
Road incident deaths in Canada
1879 births
1959 deaths
Canadian women police officers
Accidental deaths in Alberta